Eileen Ryan (October 16, 1927 – October 9, 2022) was an American actress. The wife of actor and director Leo Penn, she was the mother of actors Sean Penn and Chris Penn, and of singer Michael Penn.

Life and career
Ryan was born in the Bronx on October 16, 1927.  Her father, William, was Italian American and worked as a lawyer and a dentist; her mother, Rose Isabel (née Ryan), was Irish American and employed as a nurse, with her maiden name later chosen by Eileen to be part of her stage name.  Ryan studied at New York University, graduating with a bachelor's degree.

Career
Ryan debuted on Broadway in 1953, in the play Sing Till Tomorrow.  Five years later, she featured in another Broadway production, Comes a Day.  Both plays were ultimately short-lived.  She began to reduce her involvement in acting in order to look after her young family, which later relocated to the West Coast.  During the 1960s and 1970s, Ryan periodically had roles in television shows, such as The Twilight Zone, Bonanza, and others directed by her husband Leo Penn.

Ryan resumed acting on a more frequent basis in 1986, when she appeared with her sons Sean and Chris in At Close Range as the brothers' grandmother.  She subsequently featured as the mother of Sean Penn's character in Judgment in Berlin (1988), which was directed by her husband.  She also starred in Parenthood a year later opposite Jason Robards – whose withdrawal from his role in The Iceman Cometh over three decades earlier enabled Ryan to meet her future husband – before making an appearance in The Crossing Guard (1995), which her son Sean directed.  Two years later, she went back to the stage in the play Remembrance, acting alongside her husband in a production by Sean Penn at the Odyssey Theater.  Her final role was in the 2016 film Rules Don't Apply.

Personal life
Ryan married Leo Penn in 1957.  They met the year before while she was performing in The Iceman Cometh at the Circle in the Square Theatre.  At the time, he was an actor and active union member, who was blacklisted from the late 1940s to the late 1950s. They remained married for over 40 years until his death in 1998. Together, they had three children. One of them, Chris, predeceased her in 2006.

Ryan died on October 9, 2022 at her home in Malibu, California at the age of 94.

Filmography

Film

Television

References

External links

1927 births
2022 deaths
20th-century American actresses
21st-century American actresses
Actresses from New York City
American film actresses
American television actresses
American people of Irish descent
American people of Italian descent
People from the Bronx